Ronald J. Gidwitz (born March 28, 1945) is an American businessman, diplomat, and political candidate who served as United States Ambassador to Belgium, while also serving as acting United States Ambassador to the European Union.

Gidwitz is the son of prominent Chicago businessman Gerald Gidwitz. Gidwtiz served as president and CEO of Helene Curtis Industries, which was sold to Unilever in 1996. In 1998, Gidwitz co-founded the private equity firm GCG Partners, which he served as a partner at.

In terms of public-sector and political activities, in addition to serving as ambassador, Gidwitz held the positions of chairman of the Illinois State Board of Education from 1999 through 2003 and chairman of the Board of City Colleges of Chicago from 1991 through 1999. He ran unsuccessfully for the Republican nomination for governor of Illinois in 2006. He served as the Illinois state chair Rudy Giuliani's 2008 presidential campaign, the Illinois state finance chair for Donald Trump's 2016 presidential campaign, and chaired both Kirk Dillard's unsuccessful 2010 Illinois gubernatorial campaign and Bruce Rauner's successful 2014 Illinois gubernatorial campaign. Gidwitz has also been involved with political advocacy organizations.

In addition to his private sector and political work, Gidwitz had been involved in philanthropic and nonprofit activities.

Education 
Gidwitz earned a Bachelor of Arts degree in economics from Brown University.

Business career
Gidwitz served as president and CEO of Helene Curtis Industries, which was sold to Unilever in 1996. He served as its CEO from 1979 through 1998. Since 1998, he has been a co-founder and partner at the private equity firm, GCG Partners, and serves as a regional chairman for Business Executives for National Security in Chicago.

For many years, a company controlled by Gidwitz and his brother Ralph owned the Evergreen Terrace housing project in Joliet, Illinois, a 356-unit complex of high-rise apartments where 90% of tenants were families with young African-American single mothers. Their management of the complex attracted strong criticism, including from then-Senator Barack Obama. There were descriptions made of “inhumane conditions” and an overwhelming stench of urine in the complex. The mayor of Joliet described the complex as “unsafe and dangerous, a public nuisance and a blighted area”. A judge declared that the standards were “deplorable”. Gidwitz, in court, blamed the City of Joliet, claiming that they had repeatedly blocked attempts to secure federal financing for improvements. He especially noted his frustration in being turned down by the city in his effort to improve security—one of the main issues the same city had questioned.

Political career

Chairman of the Board of City Colleges of Chicago
Gidwitz was appointed chairman of the Board of City Colleges of Chicago by mayor Richard M. Daley in 1991. His appointment was seen as an effort by Daley to involve the business community in the city's education reform. His tenure ended when he resigned on April 14, 1999, amid a power struggle with the new chancellor Wayne Watson. Gidwitz's tenure was highly criticized by faculty in the system. Between 1991 and 1995, the system lost $50 million in high-risk investments.

Chairman of the Illinois State Board of Education
Gidwitz was appointed a member of the Illinois State Board of Education in 1999. Gidwitz soon became chairman of the Illinois State Board of Education in April 1999, having been nominated by Governor George Ryan.

In 1999, early into his tenure as chairman of the Illinois State Board of Education, Gidwitz made comments about the state's mathematics score on standardized testing, which accused the state's public school teachers of being inadequately trained on providing instruction on the subject. Superintendents of many school districts took issue to his remarks, with Paul Vallas (the CEO of Chicago Public Schools) remarking on Gidwitz, "he's not a supporter of public education, and he has a low opinion of teachers and schools in general."

Having again been nominated by Governor George Ryan, Gidwitz was reconfirmed by the Illinois Senate on November 14, 2001, to continue to serve as chairman of the Illinois State Board of Education. His term expired on April 18, 2003. He continued to serve as a member of the board until the following year.

2006 gubernatorial campaign

Gidwitz was a candidate for the Republican nomination for Governor of Illinois in the 2006 election. He came in fourth place, having been defeated by Judy Baar Topinka. Rod Blagojevich would go on to win the general election. Gidwitz spent $5 million of his own funds on the campaign.

Ambassadorship
In May 2018, he was nominated to become the Trump administration's Ambassador to Belgium. He was confirmed by the U.S. Senate on June 28, 2018. He presented his credentials to King Philippe on July 4, 2018.

Other political work
In February 2003, Gidwitz founded the advocacy group Students First Illinois.

In 2008, Gidwitz and Greg Baise formed the Economic Freedom Alliance, a 527 organization, to oppose the passage of the Employee Free Choice Act.

Gidwitz was the Illinois co-chair of Rudy Giuliani's 2008 presidential campaign. Gidwitz served as Donald Trump's Illinois campaign finance chairman in the 2016 presidential election.

Gidwitz served as campaign chairman and finance chair of Kirk Dillard's unsuccessful 2010 Illinois gubernatorial campaign. Gidwitz served as campaign co-chair and finance chair for Bruce Rauner's successful 2014 bid for Illinois governor.

Nonprofit work
During his business career, Gidwitz devoted a portion of his time to philanthropic activities. He was Chair of the Field Museum of Natural History Board of Trustees, and the Economic Development Commission of Chicago. Gidwitz also served on the boards of the Council for Aid to Education, Rush-Presbyterian-St. Luke's Medical Center, National Board of the Smithsonian Institution, the Museum of Science and Industry, Lyric Opera of Chicago, Chicagoland Chamber of Commerce and the founding Chair of the Chicago Chapter of Business Executives for National Security. In 2006, the Boys & Girls Clubs of America bestowed him with the Herbert Hoover Humanitarian Award for his ‘extraordinary service to the organization and the nation's youth.’ In 2014, the Chicago History Museum gave him the Bertha Honoré Palmer Making History Award for Distinction in Civic Leadership. His leadership in promoting better educational opportunities resulted in Gidwitz receiving the National Association of State Boards of Education's Distinguished Service Award in 2003.

Since 2013, Gidwitz has served as Chairman emeritus of the Boys & Girls Clubs of America.

Personal life
Gidwitz is the son of prominent Chicago businessman, Gerald Gidwitz.

He lives in Chicago with his wife, Christina Gidwitz, and two sons.

His wife Christina's father was the late James S. Kemper.

References

External links

|-

1945 births
Living people
American chief executives
Trump administration personnel
Brown University alumni
Ambassadors of the United States to Belgium
Illinois Republicans
Chairs of the Illinois State Board of Education
21st-century American diplomats